Krishi Vigyan Kendra, Jalgaon Jamod is established in Buldhana district, Maharashtra, India during 1994 by Indian Council of Agriculture Research, New Delhi.
It is hosted by Satpuda Education Society, a Non-Government Organisation based in Jalgaon Jamod As of 2018, it is one of 680 KVKs in India.

See also
 Van Vigyan Kendra (VVK) Forest Science Centres
 Krishi Vigyan Kendra

References

External links

Agriculture in Maharashtra
Buldhana district
Indian Council of Agricultural Research